Ben Compton can refer to:

 Ben Compton (American football)
 Ben Compton (cricketer)